In Greek mythology, Plemnaeus (Ancient Greek: Πλημναῖον or Πλημναίῳ) was the 11th king of Sicyon who reigned for 48 years.

Family 
Plemnaeus was the son and heir of King Peratus, son of Poseidon. He was the father of Orthopolis, his successor to the Sicyonian throne.

Mythology 
All the children borne to Plemnaeus and his wife died the very first time they wailed. At last, the goddess Demeter who took pity on the unfortunate king came to Aegialea (former name of Sicyon) in the guise of a strange woman and reared for him his son Orthopolis.

Notes

References 

 Pausanias, Description of Greece with an English Translation by W.H.S. Jones, Litt.D., and H.A. Ormerod, M.A., in 4 Volumes. Cambridge, MA, Harvard University Press; London, William Heinemann Ltd. 1918. . Online version at the Perseus Digital Library
 Pausanias, Graeciae Descriptio. 3 vols. Leipzig, Teubner. 1903. Greek text available at the Perseus Digital Library.

Princes in Greek mythology
Mythological kings of Sicyon
Kings in Greek mythology
Sicyonian characters in Greek mythology